The 2008 season was the San Francisco 49ers' 59th in the National Football League, their 63rd overall, and their fourth and final under the head coach Mike Nolan.  The team improved on their 5–11 record from the 2007 season, and ended the season with a 7–9 record. They failed to reach the playoffs for the sixth consecutive season. It was the final season that the 49ers wore their 1996 dark red uniforms.
With the 49ers offense struggling the previous season, offensive coordinator Jim Hostler was fired and replaced by Mike Martz. In addition, Scot McCloughan was promoted from vice president of player personnel to general manager. Mike Nolan was terminated after a 29–17 loss to the New York Giants in Week 8.

Signings

Departures 

UFA: Unrestricted free agent; RFA: Restricted free agent; ERFA: Exclusive rights free agent

Draft picks

Staff

Roster

Schedule

Preseason

Regular season

Standings

Regular season results

Week 1: vs. Arizona Cardinals

The 49ers began their 2008 campaign at home against their NFC West foe, the Arizona Cardinals.  In the first quarter, the Niners trailed early as Cardinals kicker Neil Rackers got a 25-yard field goal. San Francisco responded with RB Frank Gore getting a 41-yard TD run. In the second quarter, Arizona regained the lead with QB Kurt Warner completing a 1-yard TD pass to WR Larry Fitzgerald. San Francisco tied the game with kicker Joe Nedney getting a 39-yard field goal. In the third quarter, the Cardinals began to fly away as Rackers nailed a 31-yard field goal, along with RB Tim Hightower getting a 2-yard TD run. In the fourth quarter, the Niners tried to respond as Nedney got a 30-yard field goal. However, Arizona pulled away with Rackers' 30-yard field goal.

With the loss, the 49ers began their season at 0–1.

Week 2: at Seattle Seahawks

Hoping to bounce back from their divisional home loss to the Cardinals, the 49ers flew to Qwest Field for an NFC West duel with the Seattle Seahawks.  In the first quarter, the Niners trailed early as Seahawks RB Julius Jones got a 27-yard TD run, along with DT Craig Terrill returning a fumble 10 yards for a touchdown.  San Francisco responded with kicker Joe Nedney getting a 26-yard field goal.  In the second quarter, the 49ers continued to close in on Seattle as Nedney kicked a 28-yard field goal.  The Seahawks responded with kicker Olindo Mare getting a 51-yard field goal.  Afterwards, the Niners chopped at Seattle's lead with QB J.T. O'Sullivan completing a 3-yard TD pass to WR Bryant Johnson.  The Seahawks closed out the half with Mare's 38-yard field goal.

In the third quarter, San Francisco took the lead with LB Patrick Willis returning an interception 86 yards for a touchdown and RB Frank Gore getting a 2-yard TD run.  However, in the fourth quarter, Seattle regained its lead with RB T.J. Duckett getting a 1-yard TD run and Mare getting a 32-yard field goal.  The Niners tied the game with Nedney's 28-yard field goal.  Afterwards, in overtime, San Francisco completed its upset as Nedney nailed the game-winning 40-yard field goal.

With the win, the 49ers improved to 1–1.

WR Isaac Bruce (4 receptions for 153 yards) became the first 49ers wideout to have a 100-yard receiving game since Antonio Bryant during Week 2 in 2006.

Week 3: vs. Detroit Lions

Coming off their thrilling overtime divisional road win over the Seahawks, the 49ers went home for a Week 3 duel with the Detroit Lions.  In the first quarter, the Niners struck first as QB J.T. O'Sullivan completed a 6-yard TD pass to WR Isaac Bruce.  In the second quarter, San Francisco increased its lead with RB Frank Gore getting a 4-yard TD run.  Striking again, Delanie Walker caught a touchdown pass shortly before half-time.  The Lions responded with a 44-yard field goal by kicker Jason Hanson, yet the 49ers replied in the fourth quarter with CB Allen Rossum getting a 1-yard TD run.  Detroit tried to rally as QB Jon Kitna completed a 34-yard TD pass to RB Rudi Johnson, but San Francisco sealed their victory with kicker Joe Nedney nailing a 25-yard field goal.

With the win, the 49ers improved to 2–1.

Week 4: at New Orleans Saints

Coming off their home win over the Lions, the 49ers flew to the Louisiana Superdome for a Week 4 duel with the New Orleans Saints.  In the first quarter, the Niners struck first as kicker Joe Nedney got a 47-yard field goal.  In the second quarter, the Saints took the lead with QB Drew Brees completing a 5-yard and a 33-yard TD pass to WR Lance Moore.  San Francisco answered with Nedney's 49-yard field goal, yet New Orleans replied with Brees' 47-yard TD pass to WR Robert Meachem.

In the third quarter, the 49ers tried to rally as Nedney kicked a 38-yard field goal.  However, in the fourth quarter, the Saints continued to pull away as RB Deuce McAllister got a 1-yard TD run.  The Niners tried to rally as QB J.T. O'Sullivan completed a 5-yard TD pass to WR Isaac Bruce, yet New Orleans sealed the win with kicker Martín Gramática nailing a 31-yard field goal.

With the loss, the 49ers fell to 2–2.

Week 5: vs. New England Patriots

Hoping to rebound from their road loss to the Saints, the 49ers went home for a Week 5 interconference duel with the New England Patriots.  In the first quarter, the Niners struck first as QB J.T. O'Sullivan completed a 16-yard TD pass to RB Frank Gore.  The Patriots responded with QB Matt Cassel completing a 66-yard TD pass to WR Randy Moss, yet San Francisco answered with O'Sullivan completing a 35-yard TD pass to WR Isaac Bruce.  In the second quarter, New England took the lead as kicker Stephen Gostkowski got a 35-yard field goal, along with RB Kevin Faulk getting a 2-yard TD run.

In the third quarter, the Patriots increased their lead with Faulk getting another 2-yard TD run.  In the fourth quarter, New England added on to its lead with Gostkowski kicking a 40-yard field goal.  The Niners tried to come back as O'Sullivan completed a 5-yard TD pass to Bruce, but the Patriots pulled away with Gostkowski nailing a 49-yard field goal.

With the loss, San Francisco fell to 2–3.

During the halftime ceremony, the 49ers retired former QB Steve Young's #8 uniform.

Week 6: vs. Philadelphia Eagles

Hoping to snap a two-game losing skid, the 49ers stayed at home for a Week 6 duel with the Philadelphia Eagles.  In the first quarter, the Niners struck first as kicker Joe Nedney got a 32-yard field goal.  The Eagles took the lead as RB Correll Buckhalter got a 1-yard TD run.  San Francisco responded with a 37-yard field goal by Nedney.  In the second quarter, Philadelphia increased their lead as QB Donovan McNabb completed a 2-yard TD pass to WR Hank Baskett, along with kicker David Akers getting a 19-yard field goal.  The 49ers closed out the half with Nedney making a 53-yard field goal, along with DB Donald Strickland returning a blocked field goal attempt 41 yards for a touchdown.

In the third quarter, the Niners took the lead as RB Frank Gore got a 6-yard TD run, along with Nedney getting a 29-yard field goal.  However, in the fourth quarter, the Eagles rallied as McNabb completed a 2-yard TD pass to TE L.J. Smith, Akers nailing a 38-yard, a 25-yard, & a 28-yard field goal, and DE Juqua Parker returning an interception 55 yards for a touchdown.

With their third-straight loss, the 49ers fell to 2–4.

Week 7: at New York Giants

Trying to snap a three-game losing skid, the 49ers flew to Giants Stadium for a Week 7 duel with the New York Giants.  In the first quarter, the Niners trailed early as Giants RB Brandon Jacobs got a 26-yard TD run.  San Francisco responded with a 40-yard field goal by kicker Joe Nedney.  In the second quarter, New York answered with Jacobs getting a 2-yard TD run.  The 49ers responded with QB J.T. O'Sullivan completing a 30-yard TD pass to rookie WR Josh Morgan.  The Giants ended the half with kicker John Carney nailing a 21-yard field goal.

In the third quarter, New York increased its lead with QB Eli Manning completing a 6-yard TD pass to WR Plaxico Burress.  The Niners struck back as CB Nate Clements returned a block field goal 74 yards for a touchdown.  However, in the fourth quarter, the Giants pulled away as Carney got a 48-yard field goal, while DE Justin Tuck forced O'Sullivan into a fumble, causing the ball to roll into San Francisco's endzone, and Morgan kicking it out of the back of the endzone, giving New York a safety.

With the fourth-straight loss, the 49ers fell to 2–5.

On Monday, October 20, the day after the game, the 49ers fired coach Mike Nolan and replaced him with Mike Singletary.

Week 8: vs. Seattle Seahawks

Hoping to rebound from their road loss to the Giants, the 49ers went home for a Week 8 NFC West rematch with the Seattle Seahawks.  In the first quarter, the Niners trailed early as Seahawks kicker Olindo Mare got a 43-yard and a 42-yard field goal.  In the second quarter, Seattle increased its lead with RB T.J. Duckett getting a 1-yard TD run.  San Francisco got on the board with kicker Joe Nedney getting a 42-yard field goal, but the Seahawks continued its beatdown as CB Josh Wilson returned an interception 75 yards for a touchdown.

In the third quarter, the 49ers replied with Nedney making a 40-yard field goal, yet Seattle continued to pull away as QB Seneca Wallace completed a 43-yard TD pass to FB Leonard Weaver.  In the fourth quarter, San Francisco tried to rally as QB Shaun Hill completed a 2-yard TD pass to rookie WR Jason Hill. However, the Seahawks pulled away as Wallace hooked up with Weaver again on a 62-yard TD pass.

During the game, Vernon Davis committed a 15-yard penalty for unsportsmanlike conduct which prompted Singletary's now infamous "I want winners" tirade during the post-game press conference: "I'd rather play with 10 people and just get penalized all the way until we have to do something else rather than play with 11 when I know that right now that person is not sold out to be a part of this team. It is more about them than it is about the team. Cannot play with them, cannot win with them, cannot coach with them. Can't do it. I want winners. I want people that want to win."

With the loss, the 49ers enter into their bye week at 2–6.

Week 10: at Arizona Cardinals

Coming off their bye week, the 49ers flew to the University of Phoenix Stadium for a Week 10 NFC West rematch with the Arizona Cardinals.  Due to J.T. O'Sullivan's inconsistency, QB Shaun Hill was named the starter for the game.

In the first quarter, the Niners immediately struck first as CB Allen Rossum returned the game's opening kickoff 104 yards for a touchdown.  The Cardinals answered with a 28-yard field goal by kicker Neil Rackers.  In the second quarter, San Francisco increased their lead as Hill completed a 31-yard TD pass to rookie WR Josh Morgan.  Arizona responded with QB Kurt Warner completing a 13-yard TD pass to WR Anquan Boldin, along with Rackers making a 33-yard field goal.  The Niners closed out the first half scoring with Hill completing an 18-yard TD pass to TE Vernon Davis.

In the third quarter, the Cardinals tried to catch up as Warner completed a 5-yard TD pass to WR Larry Fitzgerald, yet the 49ers answered with kicker Joe Nedney getting a 41-yard field goal.  In the fourth quarter, Arizona took the lead as Racker nailed a 23-yard field goal, along with Warner hooking with Boldin again on a 4-yard TD pass (with a failed 2-point conversion).  San Francisco did manage to get a late-game drive.  However, the Cardinals' defense made a goal-line stand to end the game.

With their sixth straight loss, the 49ers fell to 2–7.

Week 11: vs. St. Louis Rams

Trying to snap a six-game losing streak, the 49ers went home for a Week 11 NFC West duel with their hated rival, the St. Louis Rams.  In the first quarter, the Niners struck first as RB Frank Gore got a 5-yard TD run.  In the second quarter, the Rams responded with kicker Josh Brown getting a 24-yard field goal.  Afterwards, San Francisco unleashed its frustrations as QB Shaun Hill completed a 2-yard TD pass to TE Vernon Davis, Gore got a 1-yard TD run, Hill got a 1-yard TD run, and Hill completed a 2-yard TD pass to WR Bryant Johnson.

In the third quarter, St. Louis got a 48-yard and a 44-yard field goal.  In the fourth quarter QB Marc Bulger completed a 2-yard TD pass to WR Dane Looker.  The 49ers had deployed most of the second string roster for the 4th quarter.

Shaun Hill had a perfect passer rating in the first half and a career-high 47-yard completion.  Hill also won NFC Offensive Player of the Week.

With their six-game losing streak snapped, the 49ers improved to 3–7.

Week 12: at Dallas Cowboys

Coming off their divisional home win over the Rams, the 49ers flew to Texas Stadium for a Week 12 game with the throwback-clad Dallas Cowboys.  In the first quarter, the Niners struck first as kicker Joe Nedney got a 23-yard and a 22-yard field goal.  In the second quarter, the Cowboys took the lead as QB Tony Romo completed a 75-yard TD pass to former 49ers WR Terrell Owens.  Dallas continued its domination as LB Carlos Polk blocked punter Andy Lee's punt into the back of the endzone for a safety.  The Cowboys closed out its period of power as kicker Nick Folk got a 48-yard and a 41-yard field goal, along with Romo completing a 1-yard TD pass to TE Martellus Bennett.

In the third quarter, Dallas increased its lead with Romo completing a 10-yard TD pass to WR Patrick Crayton.  San Francisco tried to rally as Nedney got a 35-yard field goal.  In the fourth quarter, the Cowboys answered with Folk getting a 47-yard field goal.  The 49ers tried to come back as QB Shaun Hill completed an 18-yard TD pass to WR Isaac Bruce, but Dallas replied with Folk nailing a 42-yard field goal.  The Niners tried to rally as Hill completed a 9-yard TD pass to RB DeShaun Foster, but that was as close as San Francisco's comeback got.

With the loss, the 49ers fell to 3–8.

Week 13: at Buffalo Bills

Hoping to rebound from their road loss to the Cowboys, the 49ers flew to Ralph Wilson Stadium for a Week 13 interconference duel with the Buffalo Bills.  In the first quarter, the Niners struck first as QB Shaun Hill completed a 12-yard TD pass to WR Isaac Bruce.  In the second quarter, San Francisco increased their lead as kicker Joe Nedney got a 50-yard field goal.  In the third quarter, the Bills tried to rally as kicker Rian Lindell nailed a 22-yard field goal.  The Niners' defense held Buffalo's offense scoreless for the remainder of the game.

With the win, not only did the 49ers improve to 4–8, but they finally gave the West Coast its first East Coast win.

Week 14: vs. New York Jets

Returning to Candlestick Park, the 49ers geared up for a rematch against Brett Favre and his new team.  The game started when the 49ers attempted an onside kick, recovered by the Jets.  Later, the 49ers went up first as Shaun Hill completed a pass to Jason Hill that was fumbled at the goal line and recovered by offensive tackle Joe Staley for the touchdown.  Then, Brett Favre ran for a 2-yard touchdown.  The 49ers retook the lead as Shaun Hill completed a touchdown screen pass to Frank Gore.  After half-time, Thomas Jones plowed through the 49ers secondary to get a 17-yard score.

On the ensuing 49ers possession, a Shaun Hill touchdown pass to Delanie Walker was called back, and the 49ers settled for a Joe Nedney 32-yard field goal.  In the fourth quarter, the 49ers cemented their lead when Shaun Hill completed a 3-yard touchdown pass to a diving Bryant Johnson.  The Jets had enough time to make a late comeback, but a Brett Favre deep pass was intercepted by Walt Harris.  The 49ers ran down the clock and punted, and the Jets did not have sufficient time to attempt the comeback. The 49ers fumbled the ball a total of 5 times, although they lost only one.

With the win, the 49ers improved to 5–8. However, they were officially eliminated from playoff contention with the Arizona Cardinals win against the St. Louis Rams, clinching the NFC West for Arizona.

Week 15: at Miami Dolphins

Week 16: at St. Louis Rams

Hoping to rebound from their loss to the Dolphins, the 49ers flew to the Edward Jones Dome for a Week 16 NFC West rematch with the awful Rams.  In the first quarter, the Niners struck first with a 48-yard field goal from kicker Joe Nedney.  The Rams took the lead in the second quarter with kicker Josh Brown's 43-yard field goal, quarterback Marc Bulger's 30-yard touchdown pass to wide receiver Keenan Burton, and Brown's 38-yard field goal.  After a scoreless third quarter, St. Louis increased its lead in the fourth quarter with Brown nailing a 22-yard field goal.  Afterwards, San Francisco took the lead with quarterback Shaun Hill completing a 3-yard touchdown pass to wide receiver Isaac Bruce and a 48-yard touchdown pass to rookie wide receiver Josh Morgan.

With the season-sweep, the 49ers improved to 6–9. This was also the 1st time the 49ers swept the Rams since 2005.

Week 17: vs. Washington Redskins

Looking to keep the momentum from their last-minute victory against the Rams, the 49ers closed out their season at home in a Week 17 duel with the Washington Redskins.  San Francisco struck first in the first quarter as quarterback Shaun Hill got a 2-yard touchdown run.  Washington took the lead in the second quarter as running back Clinton Portis got a 4-yard touchdown run, kicker Shaun Suisham got a 41-yard field goal, and quarterback Jason Campbell completing a 6-yard touchdown pass to wide receiver Antwaan Randle El.

The 49ers began to rally in the third quarter as running back DeShaun Foster got a 1-yard touchdown run.  In the fourth quarter, San Francisco took the lead as Hill completed a 9-yard touchdown pass to wide receiver Jason Hill, along with kicker Joe Nedney's 33-yard field goal.  The Redskins tied the game as Campbell getting a 2-yard touchdown run, yet the Niners prevailed as Nedney nailed the game-winning 39-yard field goal.

They were 2–5 under Coach Mike Nolan at the beginning of the season, and finished their season 5–4 under interim coach Mike Singletary.  With the strong finish to their season, the 49ers ended their season at 7–9, 2 games behind the division leading Arizona who finished 9–7.

San Francisco running back Frank Gore (11 carries for 58 yards) became the first player in franchise history to rush for over 1,000 yards in three consecutive seasons.

Shortly after the game ended, the 49ers announced that the 'interim' label had been removed from head coach Mike Singletary and that he would return next season. New 49ers team president Jed York reportedly signed Singletary to a 4-year deal worth approximately $10 million.

References

External links
 

San Francisco
San Francisco 49ers seasons
2008 in San Francisco
San